Jacinda Ardern, who served as the 40th prime minister of New Zealand from 26 October 2017 until her resignation on 25 January 2023, travelled internationally to attend bilateral and multilateral diplomatic meetings and to lead trade delegations. During her premiership, Ardern made 27 international trips to 21 sovereign countries and to two associated states and one dependent territory of New Zealand. 

Owing to the COVID-19 pandemic in New Zealand, Ardern did not travel internationally between early 2020 and 2022. Extensive travel in 2022 was undertaken to make up for this, and to promote the reopening of New Zealand to international visitors.

Summary

States visited

Ardern made the following visits to overseas locations:

 One visit to Cambodia, Cook Islands, China, Germany, Nauru, Niue, Philippines, Papua New Guinea, Ross Dependency, Spain, Switzerland, Tonga, Tokelau, and Tuvalu
 Two visits to Belgium, Fiji, France, Japan, Thailand, and Vietnam
 Three visits to Samoa and Singapore
 Four visits to United Kingdom and United States
 Seven visits to Australia

Multilateral meetings

Jacinda Ardern attended the following summits during her prime ministership:

2017

2018

2019

2020

2021 
There were no trips in 2021 due to the COVID-19 pandemic.

2022

See also
 Foreign relations of New Zealand

Notes

References

International prime ministerial trips
Ardern
Foreign relations of New Zealand
Lists of diplomatic trips
New Zealand prime ministerial visits
2017 in international relations
2018 in international relations
2019 in international relations
2020 in international relations
2021 in international relations
Lists of 21st-century trips